Alessia Merz (born 24 September 1974) is an Italian model, television host and showgirl.

Biography
Merz was born in Trento. She debuted in 1992 in the Canale 5 show Bulli e pupe. In September she took part in Non è la RAI'''s second edition, where she remained until 1995. After this experience, she took part to the Canale 5 show Striscia la notizia, where she acted as dancer within Cristina Quaranta until 1996.

In 1995 she played a role in the film Ragazzi della notte and debuted as television host in the first edition of the show Meteore, with Amadeus and Gene Gnocchi, on air on Italia 1. In the last 1990s she also took part at several films for the cinema and for television like Gli inaffidabili, Mamma per caso, Jolly blu, Vacanze sulla neve and L'ispettore Giusti.

Later in that year she hosted in RAI the program Sanremo famosi, with Max Pezzali. In 1999 has been released some calendar for magazines Boss and Maxim.

In 2000 she presented the second edition of Meteore and, with Samantha De Grenet, Filippa Lagerbäck and Marco Balestri, the candid camera show Candid Angels. In the same year she took part at the b-movie Intrigo a Cuba, with Carolina Marconi.

After that, she participated at the show Quelli che il calcio and, in 2004, she presented the show Festival: Gruppo d'ascolto, on air on RaiSat Extra and Rai Utile. In 2004 she entered in the second edition's cast of the Italian version of Celebrity Survivor, named L'isola dei famosi.

Personal life
Later she married Fabio Bazzani and became the mother of Niccolò (2006) and Martina (2008).

FilmographyRagazzi della notte (1995)Gli inaffidabili (1997)Panarea (1997)Mamma per caso (1997)Jolly Blu (1998)Cornetti al miele (1999)Vacanze sulla neve (1999)Il commissario Montalbano (one episode: La voce del violino) (1999)Un medico in famiglia (1999)L'ispettore Giusti (1999)Intrigo a Cuba (2000)Turbo (2000)Il Bacio di Dracula'' (2002)

References

External links

1974 births
Living people
Association footballers' wives and girlfriends
Italian female models
Italian showgirls
Italian television presenters
Participants in Italian reality television series
Italian women television presenters